Jaroslav Borovička (26 January 1931–29 December 1992) was a former Czech football player.

During his club career he played for Dukla Prague. He earned 21 caps for the Czechoslovakia national football team, and was part of the second-placed team at the 1962 FIFA World Cup, and also played in the 1958 FIFA World Cup.

He won the Czechoslovak First League with Dukla six times, and the Czechoslovak Cup in 1961.

References

1931 births
1992 deaths
Czech footballers
Czechoslovak footballers
Czechoslovakia international footballers
1958 FIFA World Cup players
1962 FIFA World Cup players
AC Sparta Prague players
Dukla Prague footballers
MFK Vítkovice players
Footballers from Prague
Association football forwards